Kwasizabantu (also KwaSizabantu, Kwa Sizabantu, KSB) is a non-denominational church mission originating in South Africa, which has grown to include centers in several countries. The mission is affiliated with a primary and secondary school, Domino Service School, and a teachers training college, Cedar International Academy.

History
Kwasizabantu Mission was founded in 1970 by Erlo Hartwig Stegen (born in 1935 near Durban). Stegen had been a travelling evangelist among the Zulu population of Natal since the 1950s up to 1970. In 1966-67, Stegen's efforts culminated in a revival, accompanied by mass conversions and miraculous healings. In 1970, its base was established at a place called KwaSizabantu (Zulu for "the place of help for people," or "the place where people are helped"). This became the ministry's eponym.
 
This mission station is situated on a farm of 550 hectares between Greytown and KwaDukuza (also known as Stanger) in KwaZulu-Natal, and is currently one of the largest and most successful mission stations in Africa.  The Mission has a few non-profit initiatives, as well as some successful commercial enterprises which fund its activities.

One of the non-profit initiatives is Radio Khwezi, a community radio broadcasting station which started broadcasting in 1995. Radio Khwezi is available in the KwaZulu-Natal Midlands region on FM 90.5 and 107.7 and is available worldwide through live streaming on the Internet. Radio Khwezi broadcasts a variety of programs aimed at informing and edifying the community. The Sunday services of Kwasizabantu Mission are broadcast live from 11h00 South African time.

On 12 August 2006, Kwasizabantu Mission officially opened the Emseni Care Center (meaning "place of grace"). The Emseni Care Center provides free care and counselling to HIV and AIDS patients. Some of the patients have allegedly fully recovered and is HIV free today.

The KwaSizabantu Mission houses the water factory aQuellé  and has 8.5 hectares of advanced greenhouses where sweet peppers are grown hydroponically. KwaSizabantu Mission also has an extensive avocado farming enterprise. The produce is packaged in a packaging facility on the mission station for Woolworths, Checkers, Spar and other local markets. Some of the produce is exported. It also produces dairy products which are marketed through their Bonlé brand. They also have a Saverite supermarket on the premises with its own bakery and deli. The profit of the different enterprises is used to help those in need and to further the aims of the Mission.

The director of the KwaSizabantu Mission in Kranskop, the Reverend Erlo Hartwig Stegen, was named co-recipient of a major international award — the Robert W. Pierce Award for Christian Service — by World Vision International on 9 December 2007. In 2013 Rev EH Stegen was awarded the Chancellor's Medal by the North-West University (NWU) for his humanitarian work among poor rural communities.

Controversy

In September 2020, News24 released an exposé alleging that Kwasizabantu is a cult with allegations from former members of abuse—including rape. This sparked an official, ongoing probe by  KwaZulu-Natal local authorities. As a result several South African vendors temporarily stopped selling the mission owned bottled water, aQuellé. There were also allegations made that workers who volunteered at the mission, for years, were told that they should not question where the money went because it was selfish and that it "went to the Lord", however, much of the profit was seen in the leaders of the mission having fancy cars, big houses, vacation homes and personal trust funds for their children. Workers are prohibited to question authority as they are seen as on the same level as God because allegedly God appointed them. 

KwaSizabantu Mission referred to the allegations as false and a "vicious attack", and said they had appointed a committee consisting of legal, financial, business and community individuals to investigate the allegations and publish their findings. The mission also said they were working with law enforcement to deal with the allegations and to take action against those making allegations to ensure they do not speak about what happened to them again and damage the financial stability and reputation of the businesses that coincides with the mission.

References

External links

Revival Among the Zulus - the story of Erlo Stegen and the start of the revival
Domino Servite School
Cedar International Academy
Radio Khwezi

Evangelicalism in South Africa
Evangelical organizations established in the 20th century